Alexander Michael Tidebrink Stomberg (born 3 May 1994), known by his stage name A7S, is a Swedish producer, songwriter, and singer. His collaboration "Breaking Me" with German artist Topic was released on 19 December 2019. It reached top 10 positions in 24 countries including the United Kingdom, Germany, the Netherlands, Austria, Switzerland, Canada, Australia and Ireland. With "Breaking Me", A7S also reached the British single charts for the first time and garnered his first number-one in the Portuguese charts. Tidebrink has worked with artists such as Clean Bandit, Lil Baby, Nicky Romero, Hardwell, Smith & Thell and Vigiland.

A7S co-wrote the song "Only Thing We Know" by Alle Farben, which was certified gold in Germany and Austria."Only Thing We Know" also went #1 on the German airplay charts which was the second number one on German airplay for Tidebrink. He also wrote and is featured artist on the track "Be Your Friend" by Vigiland which peaked at number 7 on the Swedish chart and was the fourth most streamed track in Sweden in 2018.

His first 2020 single "Why Do You Lie to Me", together with Topic, features American rapper Lil Baby, and was released on 28 August 2020.

2021: "Your Love (9PM)" 
In 2021, A7S teamed up again with Topic and remade ATB's number-one hit "9 PM (Till I Come)" collaborating with the German producer who had issued the song originally in the 1990s, André 'ATB' Tanneberger. Retitled "Your Love (9PM)", the record was released on Positiva Records and charted in a number of markets including Germany and on the UK Singles Chart (reaching number 23 on 12 February 2021).

Discography

Singles

As lead artist

As featured artist

Songwriting discography

Awards and nominations 

|-
|| 2018
| P3 Guld
| Song of the year
| As a Writer and Artist "Vigiland ft. Alexander Tidebrink - Be your friend"
| 
|
|-
|| 2018
| 1Live Krone
| Song of the year
| As a Writer "Alle farben - Only thing we know" 
| 
|
|-
| 2020
| Denniz Pop Awards
| Rookie songwriter/producer
| Alexander Tidebrink/A7S
| 
| 
|-
| 2020
| 1Live Krone
| Song of the year
| A7S "Breaking me"
| 
| 
|-
| 2021
| 2021 Billboard Music Awards
| Song of the year
| A7S "Breaking me"
| 
| 
|-
| 2021
| 1Live krone Awards
| Best single
| A7S "Your love(9pm)"
| 
| 
|-
| 2021
| Brit Awards
| International Song Of The Year
| A7S "Your love(9pm)"
| 
| 
|}

References

21st-century Swedish male singers
Singers from Stockholm
Swedish male songwriters
English-language singers from Sweden
Living people
1994 births